The 2022–23 WABA League is the 22nd season of the Adriatic League. Competition included eleven teams from six countries. In this season participating clubs from Serbia, Montenegro, Bosnia and Herzegovina, Bulgaria, Croatia and Slovenia.

24 September 2022 Play Off Sarajevo (Bosnia and Herzegovina) has withdraws from the 2022–23 WABA League. As per the Official Basketball Rules, all games were awarded to their respective opponents with a score of 20-0. Furthermore, the forfeiting team Play Off Sarajevo will receive 0 classification points in the standings.

Teams

Team allocation

Venues and locations

Regular season
In the Regular season was played with 11 teams divided into 2 groups of 5/6 teams and play a dual circuit system, each with one game each at home and away. The four best teams in each group at the end of the regular season were placed in the SuperLeague. The regular season began on 11 October 2022 and it will end on 28 December 2022.

Group A

Group B

SuperLeague

In the SuperLeague was played with 8 teams and play a dual circuit system, each with one game each at home and away. The four best teams in SuperLeague at the end of the last round were placed on the Final Four. The SuperLeague began on 11 January 2023 and it will end on 21 March 2023.

Final Four

Final Four will be held on 25–26 March 2023 in Podgorica, Montenegro.

Awards

See also
 2022–23 ABA League First Division
 2022–23 First Women's Basketball League of Serbia

References

External links
 Official website
 Profile at eurobasket.com

 
2022–23
2022–23 in European women's basketball leagues
2022–23 in Serbian basketball
2022–23 in Bosnia and Herzegovina basketball
2022–23 in Croatian basketball
2022–23 in Montenegrin basketball
2022–23 in Slovenian basketball